Imported from Europe is an album by saxophonist Stan Getz which was released on the Verve label in 1959.

Reception
The Allmusic review by Jason Ankeny stated: "Imported from Europe channels the frosty ambience of its geographic origins to create one of Getz's most evocative efforts -- a decisively modern and cerebral session, it's nevertheless humanized by the warm, rich tone of Getz's tenor sax".

Track listing
 "Bengt's Blues" (Bengt Hallberg) - 4:15
 "Honeysuckle Rose" (Fats Waller, Andy Razaf) - 6:43
 "They Can't Take That Away from Me" (George Gershwin, Ira Gershwin) - 7:18
 "Topsy" (Edgar Battle, Eddie Durham) - 6:25
 "Like Someone in Love" (Jimmy Van Heusen, Johnny Burke) - 4:15 	
 "Speak Low" (Kurt Weill, Ogden Nash) - 3:42
 "Stockholm Street" (Lars Gullin) - 4:12
Recorded in Stockholm, Sweden on August 26, 1958 (tracks 2-4), September 15, 1958 (tracks 5 & 6) and September 16, 1958 (tracks 1 & 7)

Personnel 
Stan Getz - tenor saxophone
Benny Bailey - trumpet
Åke Persson - trombone
Bjarne Nerem (tracks 6 & 7), Erik Nordström - tenor saxophone
Lars Gullin - baritone saxophone
Bengt Hallberg (tracks 1 & 5-7), Jan Johansson (tracks 2-4) - piano
Gunnar Johnson - bass
William Schiopffe - drums

References 

1959 albums
Stan Getz albums
Verve Records albums